is a 1993 Japanese film directed by Nobuhiko Obayashi.

Cast
Tsutomu Yamazaki as Sutonahiko Suminoe (sometimes referred to as 'old man' by Satoru), a miniature samurai who is discovered by a little boy in a river.
Ryō Yoshida as Satoru, a young boy.
Ayumi Ito as Chizuko, Satoru's sister.
Jun Fubuki as Yuuko, Satoru's mother.
Kiyotaka Nanbara
Onoe Ushinosuke VI
Tōru Yuri
Tomoyo Harada as Yuki, a librarian who introduces Satoru to the legends of miniature samurai.
Ittoku Kishibe as Fumihiro, Satoru's father.
Ishirō Honda as Grandfather—Obayashi included Honda's portrait as a posthumous cameo, honouring him as a filmmaker, and paying respects to him as a friend.

Release
Samurai Kids was distributed theatrically in Japan by Toho on 17 July 1993. In the Philippines, the film was released as My Little Bodyguard on 24 August 1995.

Reception
Samurai Kids won an Excellence-Silver Award for Japanese Movies in the 11th Golden Gloss Award. The film won two awards at the Japanese Academy Awards: Best Music Score for Joe Hisaishi and the Popularity Awards for the Most Popular Film.

References

Sources

External links
 

1993 films
Toho films
Films directed by Nobuhiko Obayashi
1990s Japanese films